Silverton is an unincorporated community located within the north-eastern portion of Toms River Township in Ocean County, New Jersey, United States. The area comprises the area surrounding the Silver Bay and including Green Island.  Several bay beach clubs service the surrounding neighborhoods as recreation centers.  Silver Bay Elementary School, part of the Toms River Regional Schools, is located on Silver Bay Road.

Silverton is bordered to the north by Brick Township.  Main roads that run through Silverton include Hooper Avenue (County Route 549), Silver Bay Road, and Church Road/Kettle Creek Road (County Route 620).

References

Toms River, New Jersey
Unincorporated communities in Ocean County, New Jersey
Unincorporated communities in New Jersey